Julio Estrada may refer to:

 Julio Estrada (composer) (born 1943), Mexican composer, musicologist and theoretician
 Julio Estrada (wrestler) (born 1970), known as Rico Suave, Puerto Rican professional wrestler and manager
 Julio Héctor Estrada (born 1974), Guatemalan politician
 Julio Estrada (footballer) (born 1977), Mexican football manager and former footballer